Christopher Kaskow is a British former professional tennis player.

Kaskow grew up in Torquay and was active on tour during the 1970s, reaching a singles world ranking of 397. He featured in the men's doubles main draw of the 1977 Wimbledon Championships, partnering with Tony Lloyd.

References

External links
 
 

Year of birth missing (living people)
Living people
British male tennis players
English male tennis players
Tennis people from Devon
Sportspeople from Torquay